Alfredo Despaigne Rodriguez (born June 17, 1986) is a Cuban professional baseball outfielder who is a free agent. He played for the Chiba Lotte Marines and the Fukuoka SoftBank Hawks of Nippon Professional Baseball (NPB).

Career
In 2009, Despaigne had one of the most dominating seasons in Cuban baseball history, breaking the Cuban Home Run record while hitting .373 with 97 RBIs. Following the season, he was named MVP of the National Series. Despaigne was again excellent in 2010, ranking among the best hitters in various statistical categories. In 2012, he set a new Cuban league regular-season home run record, with 35.

Piratas de Campeche
On June 21, 2013, Despaigne signed with the Piratas de Campeche of the Mexican League. In 33 games, he slashed .338/.364/.564 with 8 home runs and 24 RBI. In 2014, Despaigne played in 20 games for Campeche, batting .346/.407/.603 with 5 home runs and 15 RBI.

Chiba Lotte Marines
On July 15, 2014, he signed with the Chiba Lotte Marines of the Nippon Professional Baseball (NPB). Despaigne appeared in 45 games, hitting .311, with 12 home runs and 33 runs batted in. After the season, on December 8, the Marines signed him to a two-year contract. In the 2015 season, Despaigne finished the regular season in 103 games with a batting average of .258, 18 home runs and a RBI of 62. In the 2016 season, Despaigne finished the regular season in 134 games with a batting average of .280, 24 home runs and a RBI of 92. On December 20, 2016, it was announced that team did not make a contract offer and next day he became free agent in NPB. In 2017, Despaigne played a key role in Granma's win of the Cuban National Series.

Fukuoka SoftBank Hawks
On February 11, 2017, Despaigne signed with Fukuoka SoftBank Hawks of the NPB. 
In 2017 season, Despaigne finished the regular season in 136 games with a batting average of .262, 35 home runs and a RBI of 103. And he was honored for the Pacific League home run leader, the Pacific League RBI leader, and the Pacific League Best Nine Award at the NPB AWARDS 2017. 

In the 2018 season, Despaigne finished the regular season in 116 games with a batting average of .238, 29 home runs and a RBI of 74. And he was selected .

In 2019, Despaigne finished the regular season in 130 games with a batting average of .259, 36 home runs and a RBI of 88. And he was honored for the Japan Series Outstanding Player Award at the 2019 Japan Series.  On December 2, 2019, he become free agent.

On January 22, 2020, Despaigne signed a new two-year contract with Fukuoka SoftBank Hawks. However, due to the influence of the COVID-19 pandemic, he was unable to leave Cuba and was able to come to Japan on July 19. In the 2020 season, Despaigne finished the regular season in 25 games with a batting average of .224, 6 home runs and a RBI of 12.　In the 2020 Japan Series against the Yomiuri Giants, he contributed to the team's fourth consecutive Japan Series champion by scoring 6 RBIs per game in the Japan Series equal to the current record, including a grand slam in Game 2 on November 22.

In 2021 season, Despaigne had a slump of .220 batting average, one home run, and six runs batted in in 27 games since the season opener, and was struck from the first team registration on May 3. Then, on May 24, he left for the U.S. to join the Cuba national baseball team for the Tokyo Olympics qualifiers. He returned to Japan on June 9, spent the prescribed quarantine period, and joined the team on August 1. In the match against the Chiba Lotte Marines on August 21, he recorded his first home run since the opening game. He returned to form in the second half of the season, and by September 30 his batting average was back up to .271. He finished the regular season with a .264 batting average, 10 home runs, and 41 RBI in 80 games, and re-signed with the Hawks at an estimated salary of 270 million yen.

In 2022 season, Despaigne did not make it to the opening game of the season after hurting his right ankle in the Cuban League. He finally joined the team on May 17. On June 3, he recorded his first home run of the season in the interleague play against the Chunichi Dragons. However, he tested positive for COVID-19 and was again removed from the first team registration by regulation on June 28. He returned to the team on July 13 and hit a two-run homer the next day, July 14, against the Orix Buffaloes. He finished the regular season with a .269 batting average, 14 home runs, and 40 runs batted in in 89 games, despite his frequent departures. He became a free agent following the 2022 season.

International career
Despaigne posted an impressive season in 2007, afterwards earning a key role on Cuba's National Team.

He was named the Best Hitter at the 2007 World Port Tournament, and was also a part of the Cuban team which won a silver medal at the 2008 Summer Olympics.

Despaigne won with his national team the gold medal of the 2014 Central American and Caribbean Games in Veracruz, Mexico.

References

External links

 

Career statistics - NPB.jp
54 Alfredo Despaigne PLAYERS2022 - Fukuoka SoftBank Hawks Official site

1986 births
Living people
Alazanes de Granma players
Avispas de Santiago de Cuba players
Baseball players at the 2008 Summer Olympics
Baseball players at the 2011 Pan American Games
Baseball players at the 2015 Pan American Games
Central American and Caribbean Games gold medalists for Cuba
Chiba Lotte Marines players
Competitors at the 2014 Central American and Caribbean Games
Cuban expatriate baseball players in Japan
Fukuoka SoftBank Hawks players
Medalists at the 2008 Summer Olympics
Nippon Professional Baseball designated hitters
Nippon Professional Baseball left fielders
Olympic baseball players of Cuba
Olympic medalists in baseball
Olympic silver medalists for Cuba
Pan American Games bronze medalists for Cuba
Pan American Games medalists in baseball
Piratas de Campeche players
Sportspeople from Santiago de Cuba
Vequeros de Pinar del Rio players
2009 World Baseball Classic players
2013 World Baseball Classic players
2015 WBSC Premier12 players
2017 World Baseball Classic players
2023 World Baseball Classic players
Central American and Caribbean Games medalists in baseball
Medalists at the 2015 Pan American Games
Medalists at the 2011 Pan American Games
Cuban expatriate baseball players in Mexico